Ra Kyung-min (born 25 November 1976) is a badminton player from South Korea. Ra was a dominating mixed doubles team with her partner Kim Dong-moon from the late 1990s to early 2000s, resulting in a 70–match winning streak and 14 consecutive titles in international tournaments.

Career 
Ra made her debut at the Olympic Games in Atlanta 1996. She played in the women's singles and mixed doubles event. In the singles, she was defeated by Huang Chia-chi of Chinese Taipei in the first round with the score of 6–11, 7–11. In the mixed doubles, she competed with her senior Park Joo-bong, reaching in to the final round and settled for the silver medal after beaten by their compatriot Kim Dong-moon and Gil Young-ah in rubber games, 15–13, 4–15, and 12–15.

Ra made her second appearance at the Olympic Games in Sydney 2000. Competed as the third seed in the women's doubles with Chung Jae-hee, they lost in the semi final match against Huang Nanyan and Yang Wei of China, and again lost to another Chinese pair in the bronze medal match Gao Ling and Qin Yiyuan. In the mixed doubles, she competed as second seed with Kim Dong-moon, reaching in to the quarter final round, defeated by Zhang Jun and Gao Ling.

Ra competed for Korea in 2004 Summer Olympics in women's doubles with partner Lee Kyung-won. They had a bye in the first round and defeated Pernille Harder and Mette Schjoldager of Denmark in the second. In the quarterfinals, Ra and Lee beat Mia Audina and Lotte Bruil  of the Netherlands 15–5, 15–2. They lost the semifinal to Yang Wei and Zhang Jiewen of China 6–15, 4–15, but won the bronze medal match against Wei Yili and Zhao Tingting, also of China, 10–15, 15–9, 15–7. She also competed in mixed doubles with partner Kim Dong-moon. They had a bye in the first round and defeated Chris Bruil and Lotte Bruil of the Netherlands in the second. In the quarterfinals, Ra and Kim lost to Jonas Rasmussen and Rikke Olsen of Denmark 14–17, 8–15.

Ra was inducted into the Badminton Hall of Fame in 2009.

Record 
Ra Kyung-min holds the world record for shortest badminton international match that last for just six minutes defeating Julia Mann of England in women's singles during the 1996 Uber Cup with 11–2, 11–1.

Personal life 
She married her mixed doubles partner Kim on 25 December 2005, and they went to Canada to study. There they had a son named Kim Han-wool in July 2007, and a daughter named Kim Han-bi in 2008. She retired when she got pregnant in February 2007, and made a comeback in September 2009.

Achievements

Olympic Games 
Women's doubles

Mixed doubles

World Championships 
Women's doubles

Mixed doubles

Asian Games 
Women's doubles

Mixed doubles

Asian Championships 
Women's singles

Women's doubles

Mixed doubles

Asian Cup 
Mixed doubles

IBF World Grand Prix 
The World Badminton Grand Prix sanctioned by International Badminton Federation (IBF) from 1983 to 2006.

Women's singles

Women's doubles

Mixed doubles

IBF International 
Women's singles

Women's doubles

Mixed doubles

References

External links 
 
 

1976 births
Living people
Badminton players from Seoul
Sportspeople from Gangwon Province, South Korea
South Korean female badminton players
Badminton players at the 1996 Summer Olympics
Badminton players at the 2000 Summer Olympics
Badminton players at the 2004 Summer Olympics
Olympic badminton players of South Korea
Olympic silver medalists for South Korea
Olympic bronze medalists for South Korea
Olympic medalists in badminton
Medalists at the 1996 Summer Olympics
Medalists at the 2004 Summer Olympics
Badminton players at the 1994 Asian Games
Badminton players at the 1998 Asian Games
Badminton players at the 2002 Asian Games
Asian Games gold medalists for South Korea
Asian Games silver medalists for South Korea
Asian Games bronze medalists for South Korea
Asian Games medalists in badminton
Medalists at the 1994 Asian Games
Medalists at the 1998 Asian Games
Medalists at the 2002 Asian Games
Korea National Sport University alumni
World No. 1 badminton players
South Korean Buddhists